FC StavropolAgroSoyuz Nevinnomyssk is an amateur, Russian football team based in Nevinnomyssk.

History
The club was founded in 2017 by Aleksey Sagal. Sagal named the club after the company he own "StavropolAgroSoyuz".

In 2022–23 season the club became the best amateur team in Russian Cup, reaching round 4 of regions path qualification.

Squad
Due to the amateur status of the club, the players work in other jobs in parallel. For example, Jaba Tigiyev is a taxi driver, Kantemir Nakhushev is a courier, Alexander Zarochentsev is a loader, the second goalkeeper Viktor Ishchenko is a traffic controller at the railway station.

References

 Football_clubs_in_Russia